The European route E15 is part of the United Nations international E-road network. It is a north-south "reference road", running from Inverness, Scotland south through England and France to Algeciras, Spain. Along most of its route between Paris and London, the road parallels the LGV Nord (as the French A1 autoroute) and High Speed 1 (as the English M20 motorway).

Features 
The E15 has a gap at the English Channel between Dover and Calais, France. There is a ferry link between Dover and Calais. The Eurotunnel Shuttle (using the Channel Tunnel) provides an alternative link via Folkestone.

The roads in the UK are signed solely by the local number (e.g. M20).

Route 

: Inverness - Perth
: Perth - M90
: M90 - M8 (Interchange with E16)
: Edinburgh
: Edinburgh City Bypass
: Edinburgh - Gateshead (Interchange with E18 at A69 Newcastle upon Tyne)
: Gateshead - Pontefract (Interchange with E20 and E22 at M62)
: Pontefract - Doncaster
: Doncaster Bypass (Interchange with E13 at M18)
: Doncaster - Peterborough
: Peterborough - Huntingdon (Interchange with E24 at A14)
: Huntingdon  - Stevenage
: Stevenage - M25
: London Orbital (Multiplex with E30 between A1(M) and A12)
: Dartford Crossing (Charge)
: London Orbital
: Channel Tunnel
Gap (English Channel)
:  Folkestone -  Calais

: Calais (E 40 E 402)
: Calais (E 40) - Arras (E 17)
: Arras (E 17) - Combles (Start of concurrency with E 19) - Chaulnes (E 44) - Compiègne (E 46) - Roissy-en-France (End of concurrency with E 19)
: Roissy-en-France (E 19) - Paris
Boulevard Périphérique: Paris (E 50 E 54)
: Paris (E 50) - Massy (E 5 E 50)
: Massy (E 5 E 50) - Courtenay (E 511, Start of concurrency with E 60) - Auxerre - Beaune (End of concurrency with E 60, Start of concurrency with E 21) - Chalon-sur-Saône (E 607) - Mâcon (E 62, End of concurrency with E 21) - Anse
: Anse - Vaulx-en-Velin (E 611)
: Vaulx-en-Velin (E 611) - Saint-Priest (E 70 E 711)
: Saint-Priest (E 70 E 711) - Givors (E 70)
: Givors (E 70) - Valence (E 713) - Orange (E 714)
: Orange (E 714) - Nîmes (Start of concurrency with E 80) - Montpellier - Béziers (E 11) - Narbonne (End of concurrency with E 80) - Perpignan - Le Boulou

: La Jonquera - Girona - Rubí (E-9) - Rubí (Start of concurrency with E-90) - El Vendrell (End of concurrency with E-90) - Tarragona - Castelló de la Plana - València (E-901) - Alacant(E-903)  - Crevillent
: Crevillent - Murcia - Motril (E-902) - Málaga 
: Málaga - Guadiaro
: Guadiaro - Algeciras (E-5)

References

External links 
 UN Economic Commission for Europe: Overall Map of E-road Network (2007)
http://www.elbruz.org/eroads/E15.htm

15
15
1-0015
E015
1-0015
E015
1-0015
1-0015
1-0015
1-0015
1-0015
1-0015
1-0015
1-0015
1-0015
1-0015
1-0015
1-0015
1-0015
1-0015
1-0015
1-0015
A1 road (Great Britain)